Several ships of the French Navy have borne the name Northumberland:

  (1744) was captured in 1744 and taken into service with the French Navy as Northumberland. She was renamed Atlas in 1766 and sank in February 1781 off the coast of Ushant.
 , a 74-gun , captured in 1794, taken into service as HMS Northumberland. Broken up in December 1795.

French Navy ship names